Fomitopsis rosea is a pink polypore found in Western North America and in Europe. This is a close relative of another pink conk, the Rosy Conk (F. cajanderi). While F. cajanderi is a plant pathogen, F. rosea is a detritivore.

Habitat 
F. rosea grows in Western North America, most often in spruce forests. Specimens from Vancouver Island, Prince George, and Wells Gray Park have helped characterize the species. This conk grows exclusively on dead wood, with a preference for Picea, Pseudotsuga, or Populus logs. It causes a brown cubical rot.

Identification 
F. rosea is a perennial fungus. It is sessile, meaning it sticks out from the wood it grows on. It often grows in a hoof or fan shape, with a smooth surface. The top of the conk can be a pale pink fading to a grey or brown colour, while the bottom is a pale pink. The inside of the conk, known as the context, is fibrous and woody, and may have layers of brown or pink colour. It has round pores, with 3-5 pores per millimeter.

F. rosea is thicker than its close relative, F. cajanderi.

References

Fungal plant pathogens and diseases
rosea
Fungi described in 1805